James Russell Grover Jr. (March 5, 1919 – October 14, 2012) was an American lawyer and politician from New York.

Biography
Grover was born in Babylon, New York to James and Christine Grover. His father was the village police chief. He graduated from Hofstra University in 1941. In 1943, he married Mary Fullerton, and they had four children. From 1943 to 1945, he served in the United States Army Air Forces in the China Burma India Theater of World War II. He graduated from Columbia Law School in 1949, and practiced law in Babylon.

He was a member of the New York State Assembly (Suffolk Co., 3rd D.) from 1957 to 1962, sitting in the 171st, 172nd and 173rd New York State Legislatures.

He was elected as a Republican to the 88th, 89th, 90th, 91st, 92nd and 93rd United States Congresses, holding office from January 3, 1963, to January 3, 1975. He was defeated for re-election by Thomas J. Downey in November 1974.

Grover died on October 14, 2012.

References

External links

1919 births
2012 deaths
People from Babylon, New York
Republican Party members of the New York State Assembly
New York (state) lawyers
Hofstra University alumni
Columbia Law School alumni
United States Army Air Forces officers
United States Army Air Forces personnel of World War II
Republican Party members of the United States House of Representatives from New York (state)
20th-century American politicians
20th-century American lawyers